The Obafemi Awolowo University massacre was a mass murder of students of Obafemi Awolowo University in Ile-Ife, Osun State, Nigeria on 10 July 1999. Five students of OAU were killed and eleven injured.

It was perpetrated by an organized death squad of 40 members of the Black Axe Confraternity branch at the university. They invaded the Awolowo Hall of the university at around 4:30 A.M., clad in black trousers and black T-shirts, their faces hidden by masks; they carried and used shotguns and hatchets against students.

Background
An account of what led to the massacre is given by Prof. Roger Makanjuola's book Water Must Flow Uphill (Adventures in University Administration). Makanjuola, following the massacre, became vice chancellor of the university and took an active role in both investigating and punishing those from the university involved in the murders.

Makanjuola writes about an initial incident and its aftermath that occurred in the weeks before the murders: "On Saturday, 7 March 1999, a group of Black Axe members held a meeting in Ife town. After the meeting, they drove back to the campus. On the main road, Road 1, leading into the campus, they were overtaken by some students in another car. For whatever reason, they were enraged and gave chase to the students. The students, seeing them in pursuit, raced hastily to the car park outside Angola Hall and ran into the adjacent Awolowo Hall for safety.

The Students’ Union, which had also received information that secret cult members were gathering in a house in the senior staff quarters, mobilised in response to the incident. Led by George Iwilade, the Secretary-General, a group of them drove to the house, officially occupied by Mr. F.M. Mekoma, and forced their way into the boys’ quarters. They found nine individuals inside, eight of them students of the university, with a submachine gun, a locally manufactured gun, an axe, a bayonet and the black clothing and regalia of the Black Axe cult. The university authorities were informed, and the members of the secret cult were handed over to the police. They were held in police custody and taken to the Chief Magistrate's Court where two weeks later they were granted bail."

Makanjuola documents and raises concerns over the way the matter was handled by both the police and court system who broke from protocol, common sense and destroyed evidence and how this led to the failure to be able to prosecute the Black Axe members involved in the incident. Prof. Roger Makanjuola writes: "The case was heard on 31 March, and to the utmost amazement of everyone, the Chief Magistrate discharged and acquitted the arrested individuals. The students who had apprehended the cult members were not called as witnesses. The investigating police officer, Corporal Femi Adewoye, claimed that the witnesses could not be located and actually stated in Court, “I tried to contact the complainants in this case, all to no avail.

To date, there is no complainant in the case. Since all the accused persons denied the allegations against them and there is no complainant, there is no way the allegations can be proved.” This was the submission of the prosecuting police officer! Usually, in such cases, witness’ summons were served through the University Administration but this did not happen. The trial was concluded in two court appearances in eight days.

The Chief Magistrate also ordered that the submachine gun be sent to the police armourer and the other exhibits be destroyed, thus eliminating all the evidence, and making it impossible to re-open the case. The Judicial Enquiry recommended that the Magistrate be reported to the Judicial Commission for appropriate disciplinary action. Nothing came of this, as nothing came of all the other recommendations of that Panel."

Prof. Roger Makanjuola recalls following the failed prosecution the Black Axe cultists returned to the university to study. Much to the dismay and concern of fellow students. Under pressure from students the university's authorities moved to suspend the cultists involved by issuing a 'release' but failing to send the specific students official letters informing them of their suspension. Makanjuola says: "Shortly afterwards, the University was closed as a result of a student crisis. When it re-opened three months later, the cult members returned to the campus and were seen attending lectures. The students raised an alarm once more. In response to this, the University issued a release on 2 July re-affirming the suspensions of the cult members. The letters of suspension were dated 8 July and it is doubtful whether those affected actually received them before the tragic events two days later."

In addition to the direct factors given in accounts by Makanjuola and others, it is also stated that factors relating to creating the necessary favourable environment for the massacre to having occurred also played a part. Such factors include a general increase in campus violence due to university and government employment and sponsorship of campus cults. Peluola Adewale writes "campus cultism had not always been pronouncedly violent until 1980s, and this change coincided with a period when governments started unleashing serious attacks on university education.

This began with the introduction of some outrageous charges and later, in 1986, the Structural Adjustment Programme (SAP), which have now been transformed into a general neo-liberal economic programme. In order to repress the resistance of students against commercialisation of education and other anti-poor policies, the government and university authorities employed the service of campus cultists. The social background of elements who used to be members of cult groups prepared them for such dastardly activities.

They were mostly from upper and middle-class families, and therefore did not really have problems with anti-poor policies of the government and university management, for instance how to pay the contentious charges being imposed on students. Today, there are students from poor background joining cults. They largely do so because campus cultism provides a veritable platform to raise money through extortion and other criminal activities."

Another factor is said to be the university's administration at the time of the massacre. Vice Chancellor Wale Omole said to have taken no action, aside from perhaps protecting, known campus cultists. Peluola Adewale states "his (Vice Chancellor Wale Omole) administration created an enabling atmosphere for the attack. For the eight years he spent in office, Omole did not show any seriousness in fight against campus cultism, rather it was commonplace for cultists apprehended by students to get their way back to the university unscratched. While student activists were expelled for leading students in various demands, it was on record that no cultist was punished by the Omole-led management."

Massacre

On the night of 9 July 1999, student groups held a party at Obafemi Awolowo University. The Mirror Online reports: "members of Kegite Club on the campus, Man O' war members, and various other student leaders — both former and incumbent, gathered at the open ground between Angola and Mozambique Halls." Later in the night many of the party-goers began occupying the cafeteria of Awolowo Hall whilst others returned to their halls of residence to sleep.

At between 3:00 and 3:30 am (now 10 July 1999) a large number of cultists (reported to be between 22 and 40) of the Black Axe confraternity arrived to carry out a pre-planned assault on the university with the intention of carrying out the murders of several prominent members of the student union. Allegations that these assassinations were sponsored by the university's vice chancellor, Wale Omole, remain to this day but it is unclear if this is the case. It is said "one of the cultists, Kazeem Bello, aka Kato, confessed that Wale Omole had a hand in their July 10 dastardly operation."

Upon arriving at the university the Black Axe cultists "drove through the main gate and proceeded to the car park next to the tennis courts in the sports center. They disembarked there and went on foot along a bush path to Awolowo Hall, where they violently interrupted the gyration, firing guns and also wielding axes and cutlasses."

Although the order of the events that followed vary from account to account (in terms of who was killed in what order) it is clear that following the assault 4 people were left dead, another died from gunshot wounds later, one more survived from a gunshot wound and "Twenty-five others received minor injuries, which were sustained during the stampede out of the Awolowo Hall cafeteria and later on during the attack."

The Mirror Online reports: "The victims, which included the then Students’ Union Secretary General, George Yemi Iwilade, (fondly called Afrika); 400 level medical student, Eviano Ekelemu; a graduating student, Yemi Ajiteru; 100-Level Philosophy student, Babatunde Oke, and Ekpede Godfrey were gunned down by the “marauding beasts” in Blocks 5 and 8, Awolowo Hall." Prof. Roger Makanjuola writes: "Tunde Oke was still alive but died on the operating table. Four others, George Iwilade, Yemi Ajiteru, Efe Ekede and Eviano Ekelemu, were brought in dead. Eviano Ekelemu bled to death from gunshot wounds to the groin and thigh. The other three died from gunshot wounds to the head."

During the attack several accounts state the Black Axe members were heard to be "shouting, “Legacy, come out!”" referring to the suspended Students’ Union President, Lanre Adeleke. Additional targets of the attacks are described also. Prof. Roger Makanjuola's account states the same and he also writes: "During the course of the incident, the attackers also shouted the names of “Afrika”, George Iwilade, and “Dexter”, the Chief of the Kegites, demanding that they come out."
 
Of the targets of the massacre Lanre Adeleke (Legacy) managed to escape by jumping from a balcony after hearing the gunfire. “Dexter”, the Chief of the Kegites, also escaped unharmed. George Iwilade (Afrika), the Secretary-General of the Students’ Union and a Law student was not so lucky. Upon entering his room the Black Axe "shot him immediately in the head. Then they smashed his head with their axe to make sure he was dead".

It is reported George Iwilade (Afrika) was the only successfully assassinated victim. "Afrika, who was said to have carried out the arrest (relating to the incident on Saturday, 7 March 1999), was mercilessly butchered while the other four were just unfortunate victims"

Prof. Roger Makanjuola gives the order of events as being: "They first entered Room 184, where they shot and killed Efe Ekede, a Part II Psychology student. In Room 230, they shot Charles Ita, a Part II Law student. A group of the attackers then shot Yemi Ajiteru, a Part II Religious Studies student, through the head in the corridor outside the Kegites’ headquarters. In Room 273, they found George Iwilade (Afrika), the Secretary-General of the Students’ Union and a Law student, and shot him through the head, along with another occupant, Tunde Oke, a Part 1 student of Philosophy, who was shot in the abdomen.

When the attackers got to Room 271, the room allocated to the suspended Students’ Union President, Lanre Adeleke (Legacy), they found that he had escaped. Legacy was in his room when he heard the first gun shots..... The band of thugs proceeded to Fajuyi Hall on foot, where they shot and killed one more student. That individual, Eviano Ekelemo, a medical student, was certainly not a student activist, but they shot him anyway.". However, the order in which the victims were killed varies in various testimonies by a number of witnesses.

Prof. Roger Makanjuola's account of the Black Axe cultist's escape is: "The murderers left Fajuyi Hall on foot and went through the bush path behind the Hall back to their vehicles. They drove to the Students’ Union building, which they ransacked. They returned to their vehicles and drove out of the university through the main gate. The security staff, having heard gunfire, fled for their lives. Thus the exit of the marauding thugs was unchallenged."

Aftermath
The day after the attack it is reported "President Adeleke presided over an assembly in the enormous amphitheater of Oduduwa Hall; he demanded the immediate resignation of Wale Omole, the loathed vice chancellor who impeded student efforts to eliminate cults (Omole, for example, failed to expel the previously apprehended eight cultists). An award of 10,000 nairas ($100 U.S.) was offered for Omole’s capture and hundreds of students occupied the administration building, refusing to leave until Omole was fired."

Prof. Roger Makanjuola writes of what followed the massacre: "In the aftermath of the attack, the whole university was enveloped in fear and there was chaos in the halls of residence. However, within a short time, the President of the Students’ Union, Lanre Adeleke, was able to restore order and mobilise his colleagues. The students went to the town searching for the perpetrators in locations where cult members were thought to be living. They “arrested” three individuals and brought them back to Awolowo Hall. These were Aisekhaghe Aikhile, a Part I student of Agricultural Economics, Emeka Ojuagu, and Frank Idahosa (Efosa). Efosa and Ojuagu were arrested in a public transport vehicle that was about to leave Ife.

The students exhibited black clothing, two berets and two T-shirts, that had been found in Ojuagu's bag, which was claimed to be the Black Axe uniform. Efosa was a known member of the Black Axe. He had been expelled from the University of Benin and was later admitted for a diploma programme in Local Government Studies in Ife. The three of them were savagely beaten and tortured in the Awolowo Hall “Coffee Room”, the traditional venue for such events. The inverted commas have been employed because coffee had not been known to be served there for many years. Efosa and Oguagu are said to have confessed to participating in the attacks during their “interrogation”, and Efosa is said to have gone further to state that the attack was organised to avenge the humiliating treatment of the Black Axe members who had been arrested in Mr. Mekoma's house on 7 March.

In the course of the interrogation, Aisekhaghe Aikhile died, and his body was taken to the hospital mortuary. The interrogations also yielded the information that 22 Black Axe members were involved, six from the university, four from the University of Lagos, four from the University of Ibadan, and eight from the University of Calabar. There was also a separate claim that more students from the University of Benin were also involved.

The VC, Professor Wale Omole, had been out of the country  on 10 July 1999, the day of the attack and in his absence, the Deputy VC (Academic), Professor A.E. Akingbohungbe, was in charge. Soon after his arrival, the VC was summoned to Abuja to give a report of the incident the day after he returned to campus. On 14 July, his suspension was announced by the Government."

Several days later, on 18 July 1999, Prof. Roger Makanjuola was appointed vice chancellor and as replacement to Professor Wale Omole. He promised the students of Obafemi Awolowo University he would do everything in his power to bring the perpetrators to justice. Firstly he visited the Commissioner of Police, Mr. J.C. Nwoye, in Osogbo who raised the issue that the university still hadn't officially reported the murders despite what he said had been repeated requests. Prof. Roger Makanjuola summarily wrote and submitted the required paperwork officially reporting the murders.

Prof. Roger Makanjuola gives the following account of what followed: "A total of 12 individuals were arrested and charged to court over the three weeks following the murders, including Efosa and Ojuagu. Only one of those involved in the March episode was among those arrested. The other eight could not be located. Two of them had obtained their transcripts and resumed their studies in France. The students brought information on the whereabouts of a major suspect, Babatunde Kazeem (Kato), and we provided a vehicle so that the Police could go with the students to the address in Lagos and arrest him.

Kato was a former student who had been “advised to withdraw” from the university as a result of academic failure. He had been apprehended by the Students’ Union in August 1997 when he admitted to being a secret cult member. He was subsequently handed over to the Security Department, but there is no record of what happened after that. We also provided the police with information on three other individuals, “Innocent”, “Yuletide” and “Ogbume.” Nothing came of this, even though we provided Ogbume's address in Victoria Garden City, Lagos. The arrested persons were charged to the Ile-Ife Magistrate's court for the murders.

The Judicial Commission of Enquiry was eventually inaugurated in Abuja on 18 October, but did not start work until 24 November, and eventually arrived in the University on Sunday, 28 November. The chairman was Justice Okoi Itam. There were six other members, including Professor Jadesola Akande, an experienced and highly respected academic and university administrator, and Ray Ekpu, the journalist. Ms. Turi Akerele was later deployed as legal counsel to the commission. A flamboyant but highly capable alumnus, Adeyinka Olumide-Fusika, led a team representing the students.

The commission's report was submitted in February 2000 and was released, along with the Government's white paper, later that year. The Commission expressed its strong belief that seven named individuals had participated in the killings—Frank Idahosa (Efosa), Didi Yuletide, Kazeem Bello (Kato), and four individuals who were identified only by their nicknames or Christian names—Innocent, Athanasius, “Ochuko”, and “Chunk.” The last was identified as the then head of the Black Axe secret cult. The commission also recommended the investigation of 16 other individuals, including Emeka Oguaju and the nine involved in the 7 March episode. The Panel criticised the police investigation of the case and recommended that the Inspector-General of Police should set up a special task force to take it over.

the cases against those charged in the Chief Magistrate's Court for belonging to an illegal organisation eventually came to nothing. However, we were very hopeful of a successful prosecution of the murder cases against Efosa and company. The case in the Osogbo High Court, which commenced on 9 April 2001, wound on. Evidence for the prosecution was taken from a number of students and some other witnesses. There was adjournment after adjournment. In mid-2002, the Judge hearing the case was transferred to Iwo, and the case along with it. There was a further delay while the exhibits were also subsequently taken to Iwo. To the amazement of everyone, the Judge upheld a “No Case” submission by the defence on 5 November 2002. The three accused persons were released and they subsequently disappeared..."

In 2009 it was reported: "Ten years after the carnage, the relatives and associates of the victims as well as students of OAU are still crying out for justice."

Perpetrators 
The attack was carried out by members of the Neo Black Movement of Africa aka The Black Axe. A confraternity infesting Nigerian society, particularly the country's universities, and responsible for large amounts of violent crime. Many reports exist of the ill-effects cultism has on Nigerian society. One such report states: "[Cults] have brutally ravaged Nigeria’s 37 state-run institutions. The massacre at Obafemi Awolowo University (OAU) is only the most recent tragedy. Observers estimate that 150 students have been slain in the last five years, with scores more victimized by rape, assault, extortion, kidnapping, blackmail, torture and arson attack.

Cultists — who often emulate the music and attitudes of American street-gang culture — dominate several campuses with intimidation tactics. Sometimes they employ threats of murder or extortion for seemingly petty ransoms, like an “A” grade or a fraudulently written term paper. Unprotected students, professors and administrators are often forced to surrender whatever grades, goods and privileges that the cultists demand."

In 2015, the Black Axe was a persistent problem. Responsible for the involvement in the murders of at least 200 people in 2014 and partaking other criminal activities around the world such as international smuggling of drugs, extortion, human trafficking and prostitution, counterfeiting of identity documents, cloning of credit cards, cheque fraud, 419 fraud, robbery, rape, murder and are used by politicians as 'hired thugs'. In Italy they have recently been classified as a 'Mafia' organisation.

In addition to those directly responsible, the Black Axe carrying out the attack, there is ongoing concern over the effect or indeed sponsorship by the other entities and individuals possibly involved. In addition to the alleged sponsorship of the attack by Vice Chancellor Professor Wale Omole it is believed that also the government, the police and judiciary were complicit in either motivating the massacre, allowing the favorable environment for the massacre to have happened and for allowing those involved to escape any prosecution.

The Black Axe is recently responsible for the death of 11 people on July 7.

In movies
Since then, there have been many movies conveying a storyline as the incident. In 2005, a Nollywood movie titled Dugbe Dugbe, written and produced by the famous Yoruba movie star, Bukky Wright was produced. As usual, there was blur speculation about the relationship of the movie to the incident but these were later confirmed with the location (Obafemi Awolowo University), cast and storyline. In the movie, Africa (the prominent victim of the incident) was represented with Ladi who was killed on campus for his activism against cultism.

Jibola, a known cultist who had been jailed upon conviction of committing such offenses in the past was granted clemency and fraudulently made the Students' Union Group president in order to facilitate latter investigations. The Vice-Chancellor alongside another lecturers were accused and convicted of being cultism kingpins, despite their ironic opposition to cultism. An automatic self-conviction of Prof. Omole aiding the incident was made at the movie's last scene.

See also
 Confraternities in Nigeria
 Organized crime in Nigeria

References

External links
 
 
 

1999 murders in Nigeria
1999 mass shootings in Africa
1990s massacres in Nigeria
Attacks on buildings and structures in 1999
Attacks on universities and colleges in Nigeria
Confraternities in Nigeria
July 1999 crimes
July 1999 events in Nigeria
Massacres in 1999
Mass shootings in Nigeria
Massacre
Organized crime events in Nigeria
Osun State
School killings in Africa
School massacres
University and college shootings
Violent non-state actor incidents in Africa
Criminal subcultures